Brit William Miller (born September 15, 1986) is a former American football fullback. Miller was born in Decatur, Illinois and attended high school at Eisenhower High School in the same city. He played college football at University of Illinois. Following college, Miller was signed by the Carolina Panthers as an undrafted free agent in 2009. He also played for the San Francisco 49ers and St. Louis Rams. He was eventually waived by the Rams on November 20, 2012.

College career
Miller played college football at Illinois, playing at linebacker.

Professional career

Pre-draft

Carolina Panthers
Miller went undrafted in the 2009 NFL Draft, but was signed as undrafted free agent by the Carolina Panthers, where he was later waived.

San Francisco 49ers
Miller was signed by the San Francisco 49ers and was switched to fullback with the 49ers. He was promoted to the active roster on December 1, 2009. He was waived on September 3, 2010, during final roster cuts.

St. Louis Rams
Miller was signed to the St. Louis Rams' practice squad on September 15, 2010, and was released on November 20, 2012.

References

External links
San Francisco 49ers bio
Illinois Fighting Illini bio
Ex-Illini Charged with DUI

Living people
1986 births
Sportspeople from Decatur, Illinois
American football fullbacks
Illinois Fighting Illini football players
San Francisco 49ers players
St. Louis Rams players
Ed Block Courage Award recipients